|}

The Leopardstown 2,000 Guineas Trial Stakes is a Group 3 flat horse race in Ireland open to three-year-old thoroughbred colts and geldings. It is run over a distance of 7 furlongs (1,408 metres) at Leopardstown in March or April.

History
The event was formerly staged at Phoenix Park under the title 2,000 Guineas Trial. It was originally contested over 7 furlongs, and for a period it held Group 3 status. It was downgraded to Listed level in 1987.

The race was transferred to Leopardstown in 1991. It was extended to a mile in 1994. It regained Group 3 status in 2005, and reverted to Listed class in 2013.  The race was reduced in distance to 7 furlongs again in 2018 and upgraded to Group 3 once more in 2023.

The event can serve as a trial for various colts' Classics in Europe. The last winner to achieve victory in the Irish 2,000 Guineas was Saffron Walden in 1999. The last to win the 2,000 Guineas was Poetic Flare in 2021.

Records
Leading jockey since 1986 (6 wins):
 Michael Kinane – Lotus Pool (1990), Two-Twenty-Two (1998), Saffron Walden (1999), Bach (2000), Century City (2002), Alayan (2005)

Leading trainer since 1986 (8 wins):

 Aidan O'Brien - Saffren Walden (1999), Bach (2000), Century City (2002), Furmer's Green (2012), Black Sea (2016), Orderofthegarter (2017), Gustav Klimt (2018), Never No More (2019)

Winners since 1986

See also
 Horse racing in Ireland
 List of Irish flat horse races

References

 Racing Post:

 galopp-sieger.de – Leopardstown 2,000 Guineas Trial Stakes.
 horseracingintfed.com – International Federation of Horseracing Authorities – Race Detail (2012).
 pedigreequery.com – 2,000 Guineas Trial Stakes – Leopardstown.

Flat horse races for three-year-olds
Leopardstown Racecourse
Flat races in Ireland